Semioptila hilaris is a moth in the Himantopteridae family. It was described by Hans Rebel in 1906. It is found in Tanzania.

References

Moths described in 1906
Himantopteridae